Derby County Football Club is an English association football club based in Derby, which competes in the EFL League One during the 2022–23 season. The club was founded in 1884, by William Morley, as an offshoot of Derbyshire County Cricket Club; it has spent all but five seasons in the top two divisions of the English football league. The club's competitive peak came in the 1970s when it had two spells as English League Champions and competed in major European competitions on four separate occasions, reaching the European Cup semi-finals, as well as winning several minor trophies. The club was also a strong force in the interwar years of the football league and also won the 1945–46 FA Cup.

Derby County are founder members of the Football League, which was created in 1888. Over the years Derby have played in the First Division, Second Division, Third Division, Third Division North, Premier League, the Championship and League One. Since 2022, Derby competes in the third tier of English football, League One, after relegation from the Championship.

Derby's first opponent was Bolton Wanderers on 8 September 1888 a game which Derby won 6–3. Their most regular opponents have been Middlesbrough & Wolverhampton Wanderers having met 142 times whilst Derby best record is against Bolton Wanderers, Derby beating the Trotters 64 times. The most league defeats inflicted upon Derby is against Liverpool who have triumphed over Derby 66 times while the most drawn matches have come against Stoke City with the two teams sharing the points on 40 occasions. Derby have played a total of 109 different league opponents.

Key
The records include the results of matches played in The Football League (from 1888 to 1996, 2002 to 2007, 2008 to 2023) and the Premier League (from 1996 to 2002, 2007 to 2008). Wartime matches are regarded as unofficial and are excluded, as are matches from the abandoned 1939–40 seasons. Football League play-offs, Test Matches and cup matches are not included.
For the sake of simplicity, present-day names are used throughout: for example, results against Ardwick, Small Heath and Woolwich Arsenal are integrated into the records against Manchester City, Birmingham City and Arsenal, respectively.
  Teams with this background and symbol in the "Club" column are current divisional rivals of Derby County.
  Clubs with this background and symbol in the "Club" column are defunct.
P = matches played; W = matches won; D = matches drawn; L = matches lost; F = Goals scored; A = Goals conceded; Win% = percentage of total matches won

All-time league record
Statistics correct as of matches played on 18 March 2023.

Notes

References

External links
 Derby County official website

League Record By Opponent
Derby County